Sick of It All is an American hardcore punk band formed in 1986 in Queens, New York City. The band's lineup consists of brothers Lou and Pete Koller on lead vocals and guitars respectively, Armand Majidi on drums, and Craig Setari on bass. Sick of It All is considered a major part of the New York hardcore scene, and by 2020, the band had sold at least half a million records worldwide.

Though their 1989 debut album Blood, Sweat and No Tears was a moderate success, Sick of It All did not achieve commercial success until later albums. After the release of their second album Just Look Around in 1992, East West Records saw the band's potential and signed them in 1993. Sick of It All's third and major label debut album, Scratch the Surface, was released in 1994 to critical acclaim and included the singles "Scratch the Surface" and "Step Down" (the video for the latter single would also be featured in the 1995 Beavis and Butt-head episode "Premature Evacuation"). Their 1997 follow-up Built to Last was also highly acclaimed. Despite the success of Built to Last, Sick of It All was dropped from East West and signed in 1998 to Fat Wreck Chords, which released the band's next three albums. The band was dropped from the label in 2005, when they signed to Abacus Records, a subsidiary of Century Media. This label released their eighth studio album Death to Tyrants in 2006 to positive reviews (Abacus eventually went out of business, though Sick of It All would remain on Century Media, which released the band's next three albums). Sick of It All's latest album, Wake the Sleeping Dragon!, was released in 2018 and is the band's first release on Fat Wreck Chords in 15 years.

History

Early career (1986–1992)
Formed in 1986, the members met while attending Francis Lewis High School in Queens, New York City, the band was formed by Lou Koller on bass and vocals, Pete Koller on guitar and David Lamb on drums. The Koller brothers originally intended for their first band to be named General Chaos, however Lamb proposed calling the band Sick of All, with the intent to abbreviate it to S.O.A. Lou pointed out that another band existed with that name and decided to expand the name to Sick of It All. After hiring bassist Mark McNeely, the band played their first show on Saturday May 17, 1986, just a month after they formed, at the Right Track Inn in Long Island, supporting Youth of Today, Straight Ahead and Crippled Youth. After this performance, Lamb and McNeely left the band, leading to the brothers hiring Rich Cipriano as bassist and Armand Majidi as a "fill-in" drummer. This lineup also played its first show at the Right Track. The band recorded the Sick of It All demo in 1987 and the band began to play Sunday afternoon matinees at renowned venue CBGB's, and soon after released a self-titled 7" on Revelation Records (which was later re-issued on the tenth anniversary of its release, in 1997).

In 1988, Sick of It All signed to Relativity Records and recorded their first full-length, Blood, Sweat and No Tears, which was released in 1989. This was followed by the studio/live EP We Stand Alone (1991), and their second studio album Just Look Around (1992).

Rising popularity (1993–1997)
Sick of It All released their record Scratch the Surface on major label EastWest Records. They also recorded a video for "Step Down" and the title track "Scratch The Surface". The record was the first recorded with long-time friend and former Straight Ahead, Rest in Pieces, Youth of Today and Agnostic Front bass player Craig Setari, who had replaced Rich Cipriano, in early 1993.

The fair success of Scratch the Surface allowed the band to tour worldwide. In 1997, they released their second record on the EastWest label, Built to Last. This record had released a number of live staples for the band, including "Us vs. Them", "Busted" and "Good Lookin' Out". Sick of It All toured with Napalm Death and Sepultura during the album cycle. The album also marked the end of Sick of It All's contractual agreement with EastWest.

The Fat Wreck Chords years (1998–2004)
In 1998, Sick of It All signed to independent record label Fat Wreck Chords, owned and run by Fat Mike of NOFX. After releasing the "Potential for a Fall" single – for which another video was filmed, Call To Arms was released in February 1999.

The 2000 follow-up Yours Truly was less critically acclaimed. Despite containing some of the band's favored live tracks, including "Blown Away", "The Bland Within", "District" and "America", some fans felt alienated by the album's progressive nature and in a recent interview, frontman Lou Koller claimed that the album's cover art probably contributed to its poor reception.

In 2001, Sick of It All released their home video The Story So Far, and a year later a live record was released as part of Fat Wreck Chords' Live in a Dive series. The album showcased tracks from Sick of It All's entire career up to that point in time.

2003 saw Sick of It All release their seventh studio album: Life on the Ropes. In 2004, the band also released an album of B-sides, covers and rare tracks entitled Outtakes for the Outcast, which contains some Sick of It All recordings.

Death to Tyrants (2005–2007)

In early 2005, Sick of It All signed to Abacus Recordings to record the follow-up to Fat Wreck Chords' Life on the Ropes. The new album, titled Death to Tyrants, was released on April 18, 2006. The band toured with AFI and The Dear & Departed in early 2007.

A tribute to the band, titled Our Impact Will Be Felt, was released on April 24, 2007, and includes covers from artists such as Bane, Bleeding Through, the Bouncing Souls, Ignite, Comeback Kid, Hatebreed, Himsa, Madball, Most Precious Blood, Napalm Death, Pennywise, Rise Against, Sepultura, Stretch Arm Strong, the Suicide Machines, Unearth, and Walls of Jericho.

Based on a True Story (2008–2013)
Following a worldwide tour in support of Death to Tyrants, Sick of It All began working on new material for their next album. In an August 2009 interview with singer Lou Koller, he revealed that the band would begin recording their new album in November for a 2010 release. Based on a True Story, the first Sick of It All album in four years, was released on April 20, 2010. Sick of It All also toured in Australia with Rise Against to support their Endgame tour in 2011. They also toured the UK with AFI and Dear & Departed in April 2010.

Last Act of Defiance and Wake the Sleeping Dragon! (2014–present)
In November 2011, singer Lou Koller revealed to AbsolutePunk writer Dre Okorley that Sick of It All had begun writing a follow-up to Based on a True Story. He stated: "Right now we're concentrating on writing our new record, inspired by the last two tours we've done with different bands. We have some really good lyrics and tons of songs done. We'll see what happens. We've just got a lotta good stuff coming up." The album, tilted Last Act of Defiance, was released on September 30, 2014.

Sick of It All toured Great Britain and Ireland from January to February 2015.

Sick of It All spent much of 2016 celebrating their 30th anniversary with a worldwide tour. To coincide with this anniversary, the band released an EP of new material, When the Smoke Clears, on November 4, 2016.

By December 2016, Sick of It All had begun working on their twelfth studio album, Wake the Sleeping Dragon!, which was released on November 2, 2018.

Musical style and influences
Sick of It All are a hardcore punk band, being one of the first bands to push its sub-genre heavy hardcore. Kerrang! described them as "the standard bearers for New York hardcore".

They have cited influences including Agnostic Front, Reagan Youth, the Exploited, Discharge, GBH and Motörhead. Guitarist Pete Koller was influenced to play guitar in a band by the Plasmatics and Black Sabbath.

Members

Current members
 Lou Koller – lead vocals (1986–present), bass (1986)
 Pete Koller – guitars, backing vocals (1986–present)
 Armand Majidi – drums (1986–1989, 1992–present)
 Craig Setari – bass, backing vocals (1992–present)

Former members
 David Lamb – drums (1986)
 Mark McNeely – bass (1986)
 Rich Cipriano – bass (1986–1991, 1992)
 Eddie Coen - bass (1991-1992)
 Max Capshaw – drums (1989–1991)
 Eric Komst – drums (1991–1992)
 A.J. Novello - bass (1992-1993)

Timeline

Discography

Studio albums
 Blood, Sweat and No Tears (1989)
 Just Look Around (1992)
 Scratch the Surface (1994)
 Built to Last (1997)
 Call to Arms (1999)
 Yours Truly (2000)
 Life on the Ropes (2003)
 Death to Tyrants (2006)
 Based on a True Story (2010)
 XXV Nonstop (2011)
 The Last Act of Defiance (2014)
 Wake the Sleeping Dragon! (2018)

References

External links

 

Crossover thrash groups
Hardcore punk groups from New York (state)
Fat Wreck Chords artists
Musical groups from Queens, New York
Musical groups established in 1986
Revelation Records artists
Equal Vision Records artists
Abacus Recordings artists